David Castillo may refer to:

Sportsmen
 David Castillo, American football player, see Bob Crenshaw Award
 David Castillo (boxer), see April 2005 in sports
 David Castillo (fencer), represented Cuba at the 2007 Pan American Games
 David Castillo (indoor football), played for Erie Explosion

Others
 David Castillo, American art dealer, known for David Castillo Gallery
 David Castillo i Buïls (born 1961), Catalan poet, writer, and literary critic
 David Castillo (actor), Spanish actor in Torrente 4: Lethal Crisis
 David Castillo (music producer), American music producer
 David B. Castillo, candidate in the United States House of Representatives elections in Washington, 2010